The San Rafael Reef is a geologic feature located in Emery County in central Utah, part of the Colorado Plateau.  Approximately 75 miles (120 km) long, it is the name given to the distinctive eastern edge of the San Rafael Swell.  Composed primarily of steeply tilted layers of Navajo and Wingate Sandstone, it has been eroded into tall fins, domes, cliffs, and deep canyons.

The San Rafael River, Interstate 70, and Muddy Creek all cut through the San Rafael Reef. There are also numerous slot canyons that twist their way through the flanks of the San Rafael Reef, among them Crack Canyon, Chute Canyon and Straight Wash. These spectacularly beautiful canyons are often just a few feet wide and can be hundreds of feet deep.

Wilderness
The eastern edge of the San Rafael Swell Recreation area is protected as the San Rafael Reef Wilderness, designated in 2019 by the U.S. Congress.  The 60,442 acre wilderness area is managed by the U.S. Bureau of Land Management.

References

Landforms of Emery County, Utah
San Rafael Swell
Rock formations of Utah